Jean Enrico Kouadio (born 11 January 2000) is an Italian-born Ivorian footballer who plays as a forward.

Career

Como
A product of the club's youth academy, Kouadio made his league debut for the club on 23 October 2019, coming on as a late substitute for Dario Toninelli in a 2–0 away defeat to Carrarese.

On 2 October 2020 he was loaned to Serie D club NibionnOggiono.

On 2 March 2021 he moved on a new loan to Arconatese, again in Serie D.

References

External links
Jean Enrico Kouadio at Como Football
 

2000 births
Living people
Como 1907 players
Serie C players
Serie D players
Italian footballers
Association football forwards
Italian people of Ivorian descent
Italian sportspeople of African descent
Footballers from Palermo